List of rivers in Minas Gerais (Brazilian State). The list is arranged by drainage basin, with respective tributaries indented under each larger stream's name and ordered from downstream to upstream. All rivers in Minas Gerais drain to the Atlantic Ocean.

By Drainage Basin

São Francisco Basin 
 São Francisco River
 Carinhanha River
 Coxá River
 Colindó River
 Verde Grande River
 Verde Pequeno River
 Poço Triste River
 Gorutuba River
 Pacuí River
 Mosquito River
 Japoré River
 Itacarambi River
 Peruaçu River
 Pandeiros River
 Pardo River
 Acari River
 Urucuia River
 Piratinga River
 Paracatu River
 Paracatu River
 Do Sono River
 Santo Antônio River
 Caatinga River
 Preto River
 Salabro River
 Da Prata River
 Escuro River
 Escurinho River
 Santa Catarina River
 Pacuí River
 Jequitaí River
 Das Velhas River
 Bicudo River
 Curimataí River
 Pardo River
 Cipó River
 Abaeté River
 Borrachudo River
 Indaiá River
 Paraopeba River
 Manso River
 Marmelada River
 Pará River
 Do Peixe River
 Lambari River
 Itapecerica River

Atlantic Coast 

 Pardo River
 Mosquito River
 São João do Paraíso River
 Pardinho River
 Jequitinhonha River
 Rubim do Norte River
 Rubim do Sul River
 São Francisco River
 São Miguel River
 São Pedro River
 Itinga River
 Piauí River
 Araçuaí River
 Preto River
 Gravatá River
 Setúbal River
 Capivara River
 Fanado River
 Itamarandiba River
 Salinas River
 Vacaria River
 Itacambiruçu River
 Macaúba River
 Tabatinga River
 Jucurucu River (Rio do Prado)
 Itanhaém River
 Mucuri River
 Pampã River
 Todos os Santos River
 São Mateus River (Espírito Santo)
 Braço Norte do Rio São Mateus (Cotaxé River)
 Braço Sul do Rio São Mateus (Cricaré River)
 Doce River
 Manhuaçu River
 Cuiaté River
 Suaçuí Grande River
 Itambacurí River
 Urupaça River
 Suaçuí Pequeno River
 Corrente River
 Santo Antônio River
 Piracicaba River
 Matipó River
 Do Carmo River
 Gualaxo do Sul River
 Mainart River
 Itabapoana River
 Paraíba do Sul
 Muriaé River
 Carangola River
 Pomba River
 Novo River
 Pirapetinga River
 Cágado River
 Paraibuna River
 Preto River
 Do Peixe River

Paraná River Basin 

 Paraná River (Argentina, Mato Grosso do Sul)
 Tietê River (São Paulo)
 Piracicaba River (São Paulo)
 Jaguari River
 Camanducaia River
 Grande River
 Verde River
 Pardo River
 Moji-Guaçu River
 Jaguari Mirim River
 Rio do Peixe
 Corrente River
 Canoas River
 Guaxupé River
 Capivari River
 Uberaba River
 São João River
 Sapucaí River
 Muzambo River
 Cabo Verde River
 Do Peixe River
 Machado River
 Verde River
 Lambari River
 Baependi River
 Dourado River
 Sapucai-Mirim River
 Mandu River
 Itaim River
 Santana River
 Jacaré River
 Rio das Mortes
 Elvas River
 Ingaí River
 Capivari River
 Aiuruoca River
 Turvo River
 Paranaíba River
 São Domingos River
 Dos Arantes River
 Tijuco River
 Da Prata River 
 Araguari River (Das Velhas River)
 Uberabinha River
 Claro River
 Quebra-Anzol River
 Bagagem River
 Dourados River
 São Marcos River
 Verde River

Alphabetically 

 Abaeté River
 Acari River
 Aiuruoca River
 Araçuaí River
 Araguari River (Das Velhas River)
 Dos Arantes River
 Baependi River
 Bagagem River
 Bicudo River
 Borrachudo River
 Caatinga River
 Cabo Verde River
 Cágado River
 Camanducaia River
 Canoas River
 Capivara River
 Capivari River
 Capivari River
 Carangola River
 Carinhanha River
 Do Carmo River
 Cipó River
 Claro River
 Colindó River
 Corrente River
 Corrente River
 Coxá River
 Cuiaté River
 Curimataí River
 Doce River
 Dourado River
 Dourados River
 Elvas River
 Escuro River
 Escurinho River
 Fanado River
 Gorutuba River
 Grande River
 Gravatá River
 Gualaxo do Sul River
 Guaxupé River
 Indaiá River
 Ingaí River
 Itabapoana River
 Itacambiruçu River
 Itacarambi River
 Itaim River
 Itamarandiba River
 Itambacurí River
 Itanhaém River
 Itapecerica River
 Itinga River
 Jacaré River
 Jaguari River
 Jaguari Mirim River
 Japoré River
 Jequitaí River
 Jequitinhonha River
 Jucurucu River (Rio do Prado)
 Lambari River
 Macaúba River
 Machado River
 Mainart River
 Mandu River
 Manhuaçu River
 Manso River
 Marmelada River
 Matipó River
 Moji-Guaçu River
 Rio das Mortes
 Mosquito River
 Mosquito River
 Mucuri River
 Muriaé River
 Muzambo River
 Novo River
 Pacuí River
 Pacuí River
 Pampã River
 Pandeiros River
 Pará River
 Paracatu River
 Paracatu River
 Paraíba do Sul
 Paraibuna River
 Paranaíba River
 Paraopeba River
 Pardinho River
 Pardo River
 Pardo River
 Pardo River
 Pardo River
 Rio do Peixe (Mojiguaçu River)
 Do Peixe River
 Do Peixe River
 Do Peixe River
 Peruaçu River
 Piauí River
 Piracicaba River
 Pirapetinga River
 Piratinga River
 Poço Triste River
 Pomba River
 Da Prata River
 Da Prata River 
 Preto River
 Preto River
 Quebra-Anzol River
 Rubim do Norte River
 Rubim do Sul River
 Salabro River
 Salinas River
 Santa Catarina River
 Santana River
 Santo Antônio River
 Santo Antônio River
 São Domingos River
 São Francisco River
 São Francisco River
 São João do Paraíso River
 São João River
 São Marcos River
 Braço Norte do Rio São Mateus (Cotaxé River)
 Braço Sul do Rio São Mateus (Cricaré River)
 São Miguel River
 São Pedro River
 Sapucaí River
 Sapucai-Mirim River
 Setúbal River
 Do Sono River
 Suaçuí Grande River
 Suaçuí Pequeno River
 Tabatinga River
 Tijuco River
 Todos os Santos River
 Turvo River
 Uberaba River
 Uberabinha River
 Urucuia River
 Urupaça River
 Vacaria River
 Das Velhas River
 Verde Grande River
 Verde Pequeno River
 Verde River
 Verde River
 Verde River

References
 Map from Ministry of Transport
 Rand McNally, The New International Atlas, 1993.
  GEOnet Names Server

 
Minas Gerais
Environment of Minas Gerais